2021 Pakistan Premier League (2021 PPL) is the 62nd season of Pakistani domestic football and the 13th season of Pakistan Premier League.

Suspension 
On 27 March 2021, the PFF's office was attacked by its former president, Syed Ashfaq Hussain Shah and his group, and the ongoing women's championship was cancelled. Major clubs protested: Diya W.F.C. announced following: "...laws laid down by FIFA, PFF NC and the AFC...", Mohsin Gillani W.F.C. announced it pulled out and Karachi United condemned actions taken against the NC and stated to be fully and respectfully supportive of following due process as per FIFA directives.

Because of the attack NC lost control of the PFF headquarters in Lahore. Due to the attack FIFA imposed a suspension on the Pakistan Football Federation. Hence, no football activity was possible in Pakistan and the men's Pakistan Premier League was yet to start. The Ashfaq-led PFF group announced that the 2021 edition of PPL is scheduled to held from August. This PPL won't have any official recognition or status since it is being held under Ashfaq led PFF group which isn't recognized by FIFA and Asian Football Confederation.

Teams

Disbanded 
K-Electric F.C. and SNGPL F.C. in 2020 announced that they will be shutting down their departments. This could be SNGPL F.C.'s final competition before shutting down.

Teams relegated to PFFL 
Karachi Port Trust, Baloch Nushki, Ashraf Sugar Mills and Pakistan Airlines were relegated at the end of the 2018–19 season.

Teams promoted to Pakistan Premier League 
Baloch Quetta got promoted after winning their leg in the 2020 PFF League. Masha United, Karachi United and Gwadar Port Authority also qualified for the league. Huma F.C. from Islamabad will make their debut in the top tier event, even though they didn't get promoted from the 2020 PFF League, they'll replace other teams who are not participating in the competition.

Teams not participating 
Masha United, which was promoted to the top-tier event, have decided not to feature. Afghan FC, Chaman’s main club, is the other major team not participating in the event, saying it is being held by a federation which is not recognised by FIFA. National Bank is another team not featuring. Sources told "The News" that the majority of National Bank players have passed their prime. Gwadar Port Authority also won't be playing due to financial issues.

Stadiums and locations

Format 
Each team will play each other twice for a total of 22 games for each club. Each team will receive three points for a win and one point for a draw. Teams will be ranked by total points, then goal difference and then goals scored. At the end of each season, the club with the most points will be crowned as PPL Champion. At the end of the season, the two worst teams will be relegated directly to the PFF League. The first round of the league will be held in Multan. Then it will be moved to Rawalpindi, Quetta and Karachi, in that order.

League table
<onlyinclude>

Season statistics

Top scorers

Hat-tricks

References

External links 
 https://pff.com.pk/

Pakistan Premier League seasons
1
Pakistan